Colonial Beach Public Schools is a school division in Virginia that serves the students of Colonial Beach, a town in Westmoreland County. The district administers two schools: one elementary school and one high school.

Administration  
The superintendent of Colonial Beach Public Schools is Dashan Turner. He was appointed in 2018. Before being appointed superintendent, he was the Director of Administrative Services for King George County Schools. Turner was also a teacher, coach, and administrator in Westmoreland County Public Schools.

School Board 
There are five members of the Colonial Beach Public School Board:

 Michelle Payne, Chairman
 Tara Seeber, Vice Chairman
 Audra Lucas-Peyton
 Patrice Lyburn
 Terri McClure

Schools 
There are two schools in Colonial Beach:

 Colonial Beach High School (grades 8-12)
 Colonial Beach Elementary School (grades PreK-7)

References

External links 
 

Education in Westmoreland County, Virginia
School divisions in Virginia